Xelhua is one of the seven giants in Aztec mythology who escaped the flood by ascending the mountain of Tlaloc in the terrestrial paradise and afterwards built the Great Pyramid of Cholula. One of the six giants sons of Mixcoatl, the personification of the Milky Way. A Dominican friar wrote this account:

Xelhua was a giant of the "time of the universal deluge".

See also 
 Mixcoatl
 Tower of Babel
 List of Mesoamerican pyramids

References

External links
 https://web.archive.org/web/20041204073406/http://mythbytes.com/language.html
 https://web.archive.org/web/20050426032211/http://puebla.turista.com.mx/section-printpage-44.html
 http://redescolar.ilce.edu.mx/redescolar/publicaciones/publi_mexico/publicholultecas.htm

Aztec legendary creatures
Native American giants